The  was held on 13 February 1994 in Kannai Hall, Yokohama, Kanagawa, Japan.

Awards
 Best Film: All Under the Moon
 Best Film Score: Hajime Kaburagi – Tsuge Yoshiharu World: Gensenkan Shujin
 Best New Actor: Goro Kishitani – All Under the Moon
 Best Actor: Hiroyuki Sanada – We Are Not Alone, Nemuranai Machi: Shinjuku Same, Yamai wa Ki Kara: Byōin e Ikō 2
 Best Actress: Isako Washio – Bloom in the Moonlight
 Best New Actress:
Kyōko Toyama – Kōkō Kyōshi
Tomoko Tabata – Moving
 Best Supporting Actor: Masato Hagiwara – Kyōso Tanjō, All Under the Moon, A Class to Remember
 Best Supporting Actress:
Kaoru Mizuki – Gensen-Kan Shujin
Ruby Moreno – All Under the Moon
 Best Director: Yoichi Sai – All Under the Moon
 Best New Director: Toshihiro Tenma – Kyōso Tanjō
 Best Screenplay: Nobuyuki Isshiki – We Are Not Alone, Yamai wa Ki Kara: Byōin e Ikō 2, Graduation Journey: I Came from Japan
 Best Cinematography: Junichi Fujisawa – All Under the Moon
 Special Prize: Teruo Ishii – Tsuge Yoshiharu World: Gensenkan Shujin – For his career and for directing the film.

Best 10
 All Under the Moon
 Moving
 Sonatine
 We Are Not Alone
 Bloom in the Moonlight
 Tsuge Yoshiharu World: Gensenkan Shujin
 Nemuranai Machi: Shinjuku Same
 Byōin de Shinu to Iukoto
 Haruka, Nosutarujī
 Kyōso Tanjō
runner-up. J Movie Wars

References

Yokohama Film Festival
1994 film festivals
1994 in Japanese cinema
Yoko
February 1994 events in Asia